The Chorus (Hamsorayan) is a 1982 Iranian short film directed by Abbas Kiarostami.

See also
List of Iranian films

External links

Iranian short films
1982 films
1980s Persian-language films